Alexey Petrovich Yezubov (born 10 February, 1948, Khutor Sokol'skiy, Ust-Labinsky District) is a Russian political figure and a deputy of the 5th, 6th, 7th, and 8th State Dumas.
 
After graduating from the Ordzhonikidze Higher Anti-Aircraft Missile Command School of Air Defense, Yezubov served at the Soviet Armed Forces. In 1997, he was appointed Deputy Financial Director of Siberian Aluminum LLC. From 1997 to 2002, he headed the agricultural, industrial group Basic Element. He was a member of the boards of directors of various companies and industrial organizations, including the Moscow non-ferrous metal processing plant, the Sayan aluminium plant, Avtogazbank, and others. In 2007, he was elected deputy of the 5th State Duma from the Krasnodar Krai constituency. In 2011, 2016, and 2021, he was re-elected for the 6th, 7th, and 8th State Dumas, respectively.

References
 

 

1940 births
Living people
United Russia politicians
21st-century Russian politicians
Eighth convocation members of the State Duma (Russian Federation)
Seventh convocation members of the State Duma (Russian Federation)
Sixth convocation members of the State Duma (Russian Federation)
Fifth convocation members of the State Duma (Russian Federation)
People from Krasnodar Krai